Joe or Joseph Spence may refer to:

Joseph Spence (musician) (1910–1984), Bahamian singer and guitarist
Joseph Spence (author) (1699–1768), literary scholar and anecdotist
Joseph Spence (headmaster) (born 1959), Headmaster of Dulwich College, England, 2009-
Joe Spence (footballer, born 1898) (1898–1966), English international football player for Manchester United
Joe Spence (footballer, born 1925) (1925–2009), English football player for York City

See also
Jo Spence (1934–1992), British photographer